Jandl is a surname. Notable people with the surname include:

Ernst Jandl (1925–2000), Austrian writer, poet, and translator
František Jandl (1905–1984), Czech equestrian
Ivan Jandl (1937–1987), Czechoslovak child actor

See also
37736 Jandl, main-belt asteroid